Wenaha Wildlife Area is a  wildlife area near Troy, Oregon. It is operated by the Oregon Department of Fish and Wildlife. The area is bordered by Umatilla National Forest. Wildlife visible in the park includes bald eagles, bears, bighorn sheep, bobcats, elk, mule deer, and wild turkey.

References

External links

Oregon state wildlife areas
Protected areas of Wallowa County, Oregon